Paulo Rafael Grilo das Neves (born 19 August 1991 in Figueira da Foz, Coimbra District) is a Portuguese professional footballer who plays for SC São João de Ver as a defensive midfielder.

References

External links

1991 births
Living people
People from Figueira da Foz
Sportspeople from Coimbra District
Portuguese footballers
Association football midfielders
Primeira Liga players
Liga Portugal 2 players
Segunda Divisão players
Associação Académica de Coimbra – O.A.F. players
G.D. Tourizense players
C.D. Santa Clara players
S.C. Covilhã players
F.C. Penafiel players
C.D. Feirense players
S.C. Freamunde players
Lusitânia F.C. players
SC São João de Ver players
Portugal youth international footballers